Nowe Czarnowo  is a village in the administrative district of Gmina Gryfino, within Gryfino County, West Pomeranian Voivodeship, in north-western Poland, close to the German border.

The village has a population of approximately 660 residents. The Dolna Odra Power Station is located in the vicinity. Also nearby is a forest of oddly twisted trees, known as the Crooked Forest, a phenomenon which remains unsolved to this day.

References

Villages in Gryfino County